Rawson Mountains may refer to:
Rawson Mountains (California)
Rawson Mountains (Antarctica)